Karin Horninger  (born ) was a German female volleyball player.

She was part of the Germany women's national volleyball team at the 1996 Summer Olympics. On club level she played with SpVg Feuerbach.

Clubs
 SpVg Feuerbach (1994)

References

External links
Karin Horninger at Sports Reference
https://web.archive.org/web/20171109090203/http://www.volleyball.org/olympics/rosters_indoor_women.html
http://www.berliner-zeitung.de/volleyballerinnen-gut-gelaunt-zur-weltmeisterschaft-nach-brasilien-stammplatz-fuer-conny-radfan-17463642
https://archive.today/20130411011731/www.goodwillgames.com/html/past_1994volleyball.html

1971 births
Living people
German women's volleyball players
Place of birth missing (living people)
Volleyball players at the 1996 Summer Olympics
Olympic volleyball players of Germany
21st-century German women
20th-century German women